"" ("Never was a shade…"), also known as "Largo from Xerxes" or "Handel's Largo", is the opening aria from the 1738 opera Serse by George Frideric Handel.

Context

The opera was a commercial failure, lasting only five performances in London after its premiere. In the 19th century, however, the aria was rediscovered and became one of Handel's best-known pieces. Handel adapted the aria from the setting by Giovanni Bononcini, who, in turn, adapted it from the setting by Francesco Cavalli. All three composers had produced settings of the same opera libretto by Nicolò Minato.

Music
Originally composed to be sung by a soprano castrato (and typically sung in modern performances of Serse by a countertenor, contralto or a mezzo-soprano; sometimes even by a tenor or high baritone an octave below), it has been arranged for other voice types and instruments, including solo organ, solo piano, violin or cello and piano, and string ensembles, often under the title "Largo from Xerxes" or (as in Thornton Wilder's Our Town) simply "Handel's Largo", although the original tempo is marked larghetto.

In the opera, the aria is preceded by a short recitativo accompagnato of 9 bars, setting the scene ("Frondi tenere e belle"). The aria itself is also short; it consists of 52 bars and typically lasts three to four minutes.

The instrumentation is for a string section: first and second violins, viola, and basses. The key signature is F major, the time signature is 3/4 time. The vocal range covers C4 to F5 with a tessitura from F4 to F5.

Libretto

The title translates from the Italian as "Never was a shade". It is sung by the main character, Xerxes I of Persia, admiring the shade of a plane tree.

Frondi tenere e belle
del mio platano amato
per voi risplenda il fato.
Tuoni, lampi, e procelle
non v'oltraggino mai la cara pace,
né giunga a profanarvi austro rapace.

Ombra mai fu
di vegetabile,
cara ed amabile,
soave più.
Tender and beautiful fronds
of my beloved plane tree,
let Fate smile upon you.
May thunder, lightning, and storms
never disturb your dear peace,
nor may you by blowing winds be profaned.

Never was a shade
of any plant
dearer and more lovely,
or more sweet.

Because the piece is often sung out of the context of the opera there exist numerous contrafacta both secular and sacred as well as paraphrases and translations. An  example of the latter is "Beneath these leafy trees sweet peace receives me" from the chapter entitled "The EE vowel" in Functional Lessons in Singing.

Media and film
On 24 December 1906, Reginald Fessenden, a Canadian inventor and radio pioneer, broadcast the first AM radio program, which started with a phonograph record of "".

A 1980s electronic mix instrumental version of the aria can be heard in the cherry blossom viewing scene and forms a central part of Kon Ichikawa's 1983 film The Makioka Sisters.

The song is also used in the 1988 Stephen Frears film Dangerous Liaisons during a private performance in an aristocratic salon. It is performed by Paulo Abel Do Nascimento.

The song plays a prominent role in Sebastián Lelio's 2017 film A Fantastic Woman in which Marina, a transgender woman and singer, performs the aria before an audience towards the end of the film.

References

External links
 
 
 "Ombra mai fu" at The Aria Database

Arias by George Frideric Handel
1738 compositions
1906 in radio
Opera excerpts
Songs about trees